Charlie Lee is a computer scientist, best known as the creator of Litecoin. He serves as the managing director of the Litecoin Foundation.

Early life 
Lee was born in Ivory Coast, moved to the United States at the age of 13, and graduated from high school in 1995. He graduated from the Massachusetts Institute of Technology with bachelor's and master's degrees in computer science in 2000.

Lee's brother, Bobby C. Lee, is the founder and CEO of cryptocurrency exchange BTC China.

Career 
For a decade in the 2000s, Lee worked for Google. His work for the company included writing code for ChromeOS. In 2011, Lee became interested in Bitcoin. In October 2011, he released Litecoin on Bitcointalk. He had written the blockchain technology based on the Bitcoin in his spare time while employed at Google. He released Litecoin to the public after mining only 150 coins. Lee has stated that he did not intend to compete with Bitcoin but meant Litecoin to be used for smaller transactions.

In July 2013, Lee left Google and began working at Coinbase, before the cryptocurrency exchange adopted the coin he had created. Lee held the position of Engineering Director until 2017.

In December 2017, Lee announced on Reddit that he sold almost all of his Litecoin holdings due to a perceived conflict of interest. He had been criticized for his tweets, which had a possible effect on the price of the coin. Lee sold or donated all of his coins except for a few minted in physical form which he kept as collectibles.  

Lee is currently working full-time with the Litecoin Foundation on fostering Litecoin adoption.

References 

Year of birth missing (living people)
Living people

Computer scientists
Ivorian emigrants to the United States
MIT School of Engineering alumni
1970s births
People associated with cryptocurrency
People associated with Bitcoin